Daxing is a town under the administration of Pujiang County, Sichuan, China. , it has one residential community and eight villages under its administration.

References 

Towns in Sichuan
Pujiang County, Sichuan